Alfredo Eduardo Barreto de Freitas Noronha, better known as Noronha (25 September 1918 – 27 July 2003), was a Brazilian football player. He played for the Brazil national team in the 1950 FIFA World Cup.

References

External links 
Profile
Sambafoot

1918 births
2003 deaths
Brazilian footballers
Brazil international footballers
Grêmio Foot-Ball Porto Alegrense players
CR Vasco da Gama players
São Paulo FC players
Associação Portuguesa de Desportos players
Footballers from Porto Alegre
1950 FIFA World Cup players
Association football fullbacks